The Central Arbitration Committee is a UK government body, whose task is to oversee the regulation of UK labour law as it relates to trade union recognition and collective bargaining.

Chairs

Michael Burton
Former deputy chair, PL Davies

See also
UK labour law
Acas

External links
CAC website

United Kingdom labour law